Afrotethina is a genus of beach flies in the family Canacidae (formally Tethinidae). All known species are Afrotropical in distribution .

Species
A. aemiliani Munari, 1986
A. aurisetulosa (Lamb, 1914)
A. brevicostata Munari, 1990
A. femoralis Munari, 1981
A. kaplanae Munari, 1994
A. martinezi Munari, 2005
A. persimilis Munari, 1991
A. stuckenbergi Munari, 1990

References

Canacidae
Schizophora genera